The Rivonia Trial took place in South Africa between 9 October 1963 and 12 June 1964, and led to the imprisonment of Nelson Mandela and the others among the accused who were convicted of sabotage and sentenced to life at the Palace of Justice, Pretoria.

Origins 

The Rivonia Trial took its name from Rivonia, the suburb of Johannesburg where leaders had been arrested (and documents discovered) at Liliesleaf Farm, privately owned by Arthur Goldreich, on 11 July 1963. Various people and groups, including the African National Congress and Communist Party of South Africa, had been using the farm as a hideout. Among others, Nelson Mandela had moved onto the farm in October 1961 and evaded security police while masquerading as a gardener and cook called David Motsamayi (meaning "David the walker").

"The Rivonia raid was a stunning and welcome development for most white South Africans—a major breakthrough in the nation's fight against terrorism."

Men such as Walter Sisulu, Govan Mbeki and other high commanders of uMkhonto we Sizwe (MK) said on their previous meeting that on 11 July they will be holding their last meeting in the farm, the agenda would be Mayibuye and the new place for their next meetings.
 
Nelson Mandela was already imprisoned on 5 August 1962; on 11 July at their last meeting at 3:00 pm Lionel Bernstein, Denis Goldberg, Arthur Goldreich, Bob Hepple, Abdulhay Jassat, Ahmed Kathrada, Govan Mbeki, Raymond Mhlaba, Andrew Mlangeni, Moosa Moolla, Elias Motsoaledi, Walter Sisulu and Harold Wolpe were all arrested by South African Police. Other key leaders such as Oliver Tambo, Moses Kotane, Joe Slovo, Moses Mabhida, Stephen Dlamini, Joe Modise, Alfred Nzo, Wilton Mkwayi and others were not at the farm at the time of the arrests. They were detained under the General Law Amendment Act No 37 of 1963, which allowed for detention of up to ninety days.

The arrest of the MK high command members resulted in them being sentenced to life imprisonment, to others being arrested and to others going into exile.

Those arrested and those who stood trial 
Arrested were:
 Lionel Bernstein, architect and member of the South African Communist Party (SACP)
 Denis Goldberg, a Cape Town engineer and leader of the Congress of Democrats
 Arthur Goldreich
 Bob Hepple
 Abdulhay Jassat
 James Kantor, brother-in-law of Harold Wolpe
 Ahmed Kathrada
 Nelson Mandela
 Govan Mbeki
 Raymond Mhlaba
 Andrew Mlangeni
 Moosa Moolla
 Elias Motsoaledi, trade union and ANC member
 Walter Sisulu
 Harold Wolpe, prominent attorney and activist

Goldberg, Bernstein, Wolpe, Kantor, and Goldreich were Jewish South Africans; Hepple was of English descent on his father's side and Dutch and Jewish on his mother's; Jassat, Kathrada, Moolla were Indian Muslims; Mandela, Mbeki and Mhlaba were Xhosa people; Motsoaledi and Mlangeni were Sothos and Sisulu was Xhosa (he had an English father and a Xhosa mother).

The leaders who were prosecuted in the Rivonia Trial also included Mandela, who was in Pretoria Local prison with  the prisoner number 19476/62. He was serving a five-year sentence for inciting workers to strike - trade unions were illegal for black workers - and leaving the country illegally. 

The government took advantage of legal provisions allowing for accused persons to be held for 90 days without trial, and the defendants were held incommunicado. Withstanding beatings and torture, Goldreich, Jassat, Moolla and Wolpe escaped from jail on 11 August. Their escape infuriated the prosecutors and police, who considered Goldreich to be "the arch-conspirator".

The chief prosecutor was Dr. Percy Yutar, deputy attorney-general of the Transvaal.

The presiding judge was Dr. Quartus de Wet, judge-president of the Transvaal.

The first trial indictment document listed 11 names as the accused. The trial began in October 1963. Counsel for the accused successfully challenged the legal sufficiency of the document, with the result that Justice de Wet quashed it. Prior to dismissal of the first indictment, the state withdrew all charges against Bob Hepple, Hepple subsequently fled the country, without testifying, and stated "that he never had any intention of testifying". The second indictment thus only listed 10 out of the original 11 names, referring to them as Accused 1 through 10:
 Nelson Mandela (Accused No. 1)
 Walter Sisulu (Accused No. 2)
 Denis Goldberg (Accused No. 3)
 Govan Mbeki (Accused No. 4)
 Ahmed Kathrada (Accused No. 5)
 Lionel Bernstein (Accused No. 6)
 Raymond Mhlaba (Accused No. 7)
 James Kantor (Accused No. 8)
 Elias Motsoaledi (Accused No. 9)
 Andrew Mlangeni (Accused No. 10); he was the last to testify on trial
 Bob Hepple (Accused No. 11); he never testified.

Mlangeni, who died on 21 July 2020, was the last surviving Rivonia defendant following the death of Goldberg on 29 April same year.

Defence lawyers 

Nat Levy was attorney of record in Pretoria for Mandela and the other accused, with the exception of Kantor. The defence team comprised Joel Joffe, who was the instructing attorney, Bram Fischer, Vernon Berrangé, Arthur Chaskalson and George Bizos. Hilda Bernstein (wife of Rusty Bernstein) approached Joffe after being rebuffed by other lawyers who claimed to be too busy or afraid to act for her husband. Joffe was subsequently also approached by Albertina Sisulu (wife of Walter Sisulu), Annie Goldberg (mother of Dennis Goldberg) and Winnie Mandela (wife of Nelson Mandela). Joffe agreed to act as attorney for all of the accused except Kantor, who would require separate counsel, and Bob Hepple.

Joffe initially secured the services of advocates Arthur Chaskalson and George Bizos, then persuaded Bram Fischer to act as lead counsel. Vernon Berrangé was also later recruited to join the team of advocates. The defence line-up for the majority of the accused was:
 Joel Joffe (instructing attorney)
 Bram Fischer (advocate, lead counsel)
 Vernon Berrangé (advocate)
 George Bizos (advocate)
 Arthur Chaskalson (advocate)
 Harold Hanson (advocate)

The accused all agreed that Kantor's defence could share nothing in common with the rest of the accused. He thus arranged a separate defence team. Denis Kuny (later counsel in the Bram Fischer trial), was involved at the beginning of the trial defending Kantor. After State Prosecutor Yutar accused him of having been on the mailing list of the Communist Party, Kuny was debriefed and forced to withdraw. While Harold Hanson primarily represented Kantor, he was also invited to deliver the plea for mitigation for the other 9 accused. The defence line-up for Kantor was:

 John Coaker (advocate)
 Harold Hanson (advocate)
 George Lowen (advocate)
 H. C. Nicholas (advocate)
 Harry Schwarz (advocate)

Charges 

Charges were:

 recruiting persons for training in the preparation and use of explosives and in guerrilla warfare for the purpose of violent revolution and committing acts of sabotage
 conspiring to commit the aforementioned acts and to aid foreign military units when they invaded the Republic
 acting in these ways to further the objectives of communism
 soliciting and receiving money for these purposes from sympathizers in Uganda, Algeria, Ethiopia, Liberia, Nigeria, Tunisia, and elsewhere.

"Production requirements" for munitions for a six-month period were sufficient, the prosecutor Percy Yutar said in his opening address, to blow up a city the size of Johannesburg.

Kantor was discharged at the end of the prosecution's case.

The trial was condemned by the United Nations Security Council and nations around the world, leading to international sanctions against the South African government in some cases.

Escapes 

 Arthur Goldreich, Abdulhay Jassat, Moosa Moolla, and Harold Wolpe escaped from The Fort prison in Johannesburg while on remand after bribing a prison guard. After hiding in various safe houses for two months Goldreich and Wolpe escaped to Swaziland dressed as priests with the aid of Mannie Brown, who later helped to set up tour operator Africa Hinterland as a cover to deliver weapons to the ANC. From Swaziland, Vernon Berrangé was to charter a plane to take them on to Lobatse, a small town in south-eastern Botswana. Jassat and Moolla escaped into exile in India.
 Wolpe's escape saw his brother-in-law James Kantor, who had been serving as a member of the defence team, arrested and charged with the same crimes as Mandela and his co-accused. Harry Schwarz, a close friend and a well-known politician, acted as his defence. After being dealt with aggressively by the prosecutor Percy Yutar, who sought to portray him as a vital cog of MK, Kantor was discharged by Judge Quartus de Wet, who ruled that he had no case to answer.  Following his release, Kantor fled the country.  He was to die of a massive heart attack in 1974.

Mandela's speech 

At the beginning of the defence's proceedings, Nelson Mandela gave a three-hour speech from the defendant's dock, in which he explained and defended the ANC's key political positions.  He justified the movement's decision, in view of the increasing restrictions on permitted political activity on the part of non-White Africans, to go beyond its earlier use of constitutional methods and Gandhian non-violent opposition to the state, embracing a campaign of sabotage against property (designed to minimize risks of injury and death), while also starting to train a military wing for possible future use. He also discussed in some detail the relationship between the ANC and the SACP, explaining that, while the two shared a commitment to action against the apartheid system, he was wedded to a model of constitutional democracy for South Africa (he singled out the British political model for particular praise), and also supported a market economy rather than a communist economic model.  The speech is considered one of the founding moments of South African democracy.

Mandela's closing words have been much-quoted.  They were reportedly spoken looking the judge full in the eyes. His statement that he was prepared to die for the cause was strongly resisted by his lawyers, who feared it might itself provoke a death sentence.  In a concession to their concerns, Mandela inserted the words "if it needs be". Nelson Mandela, speaking in the dock of the court on 20 April 1964, said:

Results 

Although the prosecution did not formally request the death penalty, close observers of the trial considered such a sentence to be implicit in the prosecutor's presentation of his case.  Opposition to the death penalty included both public campaigns internationally, the United Nations, and the defence's arguments within the courtroom.  Harold Hanson was called upon to argue in mitigation. He compared the African struggle for rights to the earlier Afrikaner's struggle, citing precedents for temperate sentencing, even in cases of treason. On 12 June 1964, eight defendants were sentenced to life imprisonment; Lionel Bernstein was acquitted. Unsubstantiated evidence suggests that Hanson, in a private hearing with de Wet, persuaded him to commute the death sentence for high treason to life imprisonment.

 There was no surprise in the fact that Mandela, Sisulu, Mbeki, Motsoaledi, Mlangeni, and Goldberg were found guilty on all four counts. The defence had hoped that Mhlaba, Kathrada, and Bernstein might escape conviction because of the skimpiness of evidence that they were parties to the conspiracy, although undoubtedly they could be prosecuted on other charges. But Mhlaba too was found guilty on all counts, and Kathrada, on one charge of conspiracy. Bernstein, however, was found not guilty. He was rearrested, released on bail, and placed under house arrest. Later he fled the country.

Denis Goldberg went to Pretoria Central Prison instead of Robben Island (at that time the only security wing for white political prisoners in South Africa), where he served 22 years.

The releases

 In 1985, 28 February; Denis Goldberg was released from the custody of the National Party government after spending 22 years in Pretoria Central Prison white prison. He was released by order of President P. W. Botha.
 In 1987, 5 November; Govan Mbeki was released from the custody of the National Party government after serving 24 years in the Robben Island prison. He was released by order of President P. W. Botha.
 In 1989, 15 October; Ahmed Kathrada, Raymond Mhlaba, Andrew Mlangeni, Elias Motsoaledi and Walter Sisulu were released from the custody of the National Party government after spending 26 years each in Robben Island and Pollsmoor Prison; and their release which also included Wilton Mkwayi after spending 25 years for Little Rivonia Trial, Oscar Mpetha after spending more than 6 years, and the co-founder and former leader of the Pan Africanist Congress Jafta Masemola after he also spent 27 years in prison. They were released by order of President F. W. de Klerk.
 In 1990, 11 February; Nelson Mandela was released after spending 27 years and eight months in prison as a result of the Rivonia trial (18 years of which were spent on Robben Island). He was released by order of President F. W. de Klerk.

Restoration of the Rivonia Trial sound archive 
The Rivonia Trial was recorded on Dictabelts, a now obsolete audio recording format. Nearly 250 hours of the trial proceedings were recorded on 591 Dictabelts, kept by the National Archives and Records Service of South Africa (NARSSA). In 2001, seven of the Dictabelts were digitised by the British Library. This included Nelson Mandela's "I am prepared to die" statement from the dock. In 2007, documents relating to the Criminal Court Case No. 253/1963 (State Versus N Mandela and Others) were recommended for inclusion in the Memory of the World Register in 2007. In 2012, NARSSA approached the French Institute of South Africa (IFAS) and the French National Audiovisual Institute (INA) to start a process of digitisation and restoration of the rest of the Rivonia Trial sound archive. French engineer, historian and inventor, Henri Chamoux, took a little over 15 months to edit and digitize 230 hours of recording using his own invention the Archeophone.

The digitised recordings were officially returned to South Africa, in 2018, as part of Nelson Mandela's Centenary, a one-day international colloquium "Listening to the Rivonia Trial : Courts, Archives and Liberation Movements" was organised to commemorate, discussing issues relating to the act of collecting, mapping, digitising and restoring archives and raising ethical questions that, in turn, become historical questions.

In film 
The 1966 film entitled Der Rivonia-Prozess directed by Jürgen Goslar with Simon Sabela as Nelson Mandela.
The 2017 film entitled Bram Fischer (aka An Act of Defiance), directed by Jean van de Velde, covers the story of the trial, focusing on the involvement of the lead counsel for the defence, Bram Fischer.
In 2017 the two remaining survivors of the Rivonia trial – Denis Goldberg and Andrew Mlangeni – appeared in a documentary film entitled Life is Wonderful, directed by Sir Nicholas Stadlen, which tells the story of the trial. (The title reflects Goldberg's words to his mother at the end of the trial on hearing that he and his comrades had been spared the death sentence).
A 2018 French documentary entitled The State Against Mandela and the Others (written by journalist Nicolas Champeaux and directed by Gilles Porte), covers the story using actual audio recordings of the trial along with charcoal-style animation. It includes excerpts of interviews with some of the accused and others involved directly or indirectly in the trial.

See also 

 List of massacres in South Africa
 Little Rivonia Trial
 The World That Was Ours
 1956 Treason Trial
 1963 in South Africa
 1964 in South Africa

References

Citations

Sources

External links

 Rivonia Trial 1963-1964 (SA History Online)
 Rescuing the Rivonia Trial recordings, including extracts from the original Dictabelt recordings made in court, and restored to audible condition with technical assistance from the British Library
 "The Rivonia Trial" – article by Sunder Katwala from The Observer, dated Sunday, 11 February 2001
 ANC history
 On the trail of Mandela's handgun.
 Rivonia Unmasked The prosecutor's account of the Rivonia Trial.
 Historical Papers of the Rivonia Trial, Digital Collection at the University of the Witwatersrand.
 Rivonia Trial Images
 Baileys African History Archive – Rivonia Trial
 I am prepared to die speech – Mandela

1963 in South African law
1964 in South African law
Events associated with apartheid
History of Pretoria
Opposition to apartheid in South Africa
Trials in South Africa
Trial, Rivonia, 1963-1964
Events in Pretoria